Aham Premasmi is a 2005 Indian Kannada-language romance film directed by V. Ravichandran. The film stars his brother Balaji and Aarti Chhabria. Besides acting, V. Ravichandran has written, produced, edited and composed music for the film.

Cast
Balaji as Eeshwar
Aarti Chhabria as Apsara
V. Ravichandran as the God of Love
Sharan
Ganesh as Ganesha
Ramakrishna
Chitra Shenoy
Bullet Prakash
Bank Janardhan
Shankar Ashwath
Sarigama Viji

Soundtrack
All the songs were composed, written and scored by V. Ravichandran.

Awards
 Udaya Film Award for Best Supporting actor - V. Ravichandran
 Karnataka State Film Award for Best Art Direction - Ismail, Shivakumar

References

External links

Movie review
Rediff review

2005 films
2000s Kannada-language films
Indian romance films
Films directed by V. Ravichandran
Films scored by V. Ravichandran
2000s romance films